The Bay of Zea,  since Ottoman times and until recently known as Paşalimanı (Πασαλιμάνι), is a broad bay located at the eastern coast of the Piraeus peninsula in Athens, Greece. It hosted the swimming events at the 1896 Summer Olympics held in Athens. A seaport and marina are in the bay. During ancient times this bay was the biggest Athenian military harbour, where the fleet of triremes were built. Following its renovation in 2004 in relation to the 2004 Summer Olympics, the seaport now has a total of 670 berths for boats up to 150 meters in length and up to 10 meters in draught. The marina is managed by D Marinas Hellas, a global marinas network, that manages requests and reservations for berthing at Zea as well as services offered at the marina such as fuel, bathrooms, showers, port police, etc. The marina is also a part of the Greek Marinas Association.

Gallery

References

Maritime database profile of the Zea, Greece marina. - accessed 4 July 2010.
Portbooker.com profile of the Zea, Greece marina. - accessed 4 July 2010.
Wallechinsky, David and Jaime Loucky (2008). "Swimming (Men): 100-Meter Freestyle". In The Complete Book of the Olympics: 2008 Edition. London: Aurum Press Limited. pp. 897–8.
Worldportsource.com profile of the Zea, Greece marina. - accessed 4 July 2010.

Venues of the 1896 Summer Olympics
Olympic swimming venues
Bays of Greece
Areas of Athens
Ancient Athens
Piraeus
Landforms of Piraeus (regional unit)
Landforms of Attica
Marinas in Greece